Gam  is a village development committee in Rolpa District in the Rapti Zone of north-eastern Nepal. At the time of the 1991 Nepal census it had a population of 4349 people living in 880 individual households.

References

Populated places in Rolpa District

Gam is one of the beautiful village in Nepal.